The discography of German melodic death metal band Heaven Shall Burn consists of nine studio albums, one compilation, one EP, one video album and 13 music videos. They were also featured on six split releases, two of which are collaborations with metalcore band Caliban.

Studio albums

Compilation albums

Video albums

EPs

Split releases

Music videos

Covered songs
Most of Heaven Shall Burn's studio albums include a cover song. A list of songs the band has covered follows:

References

Heavy metal group discographies
Discographies of German artists